Devullu ( Gods) is a 2000 Telugu-language supernatural film directed by Kodi Ramakrishna. It stars Pruthivi, Raasi, Master Nandan, Baby Nitya, while Suman, Srikanth, Rajendra Prasad, Ramya Krishna, Laya were in supporting roles and music was composed by Vandemataram Srinivas. It was produced by Chegondi Haribabu, Karatam Rambabu under the Babu Pictures banner. The film was dubbed in Tamil as Kuzhanthayum Deivamum.

Plot
Prashanth is a popular singer who weds his fan Nirmala. Soon after, Prasanth's career falters just as Nirmala's singing career begins to thrive. Eventually, the couple is blessed with two kids Chintu and Bhavani. Therein, ego clashes arise between the duo, due to the popularity of Nirmala that overshaws Prashanth which leads to the talk of divorce and the kids become victims of it. During that plight, the children learn from their grandmother that all these sinister occurrences are because she forgot to accomplish several solemn vows at seven holy places Kanipakam, Tirumala, Bhadrachalam, Vijayawada, Srisailam, Shiridi and Sabarimala, respectively. Right now, the children decide to keep those promises to get their parents back together. The rest of the story is about how they succeed with the help of Gods.

Cast

Pruthvi as Prashanth
Raasi as Nirmala 
Suman as Lord Venkateswara
Kalpana as Goddess Alamelu 
Srikanth as Lord Rama
Laya as Goddess Sita
Rajendra Prasad as Lord Hanuman
S. P. Balasubrahmanyam as Mushika
Ramya Krishna as Goddess Durga / Bhramarambika
Vijayachander as Sai Baba
Anil Meka as Lakshmana
Allu Ramalingaiah as Contractor
Ali as Street Magician
M. S. Narayana as Lawyer
Tanikella Bharani as TV Anchor
A. V. S. as Prashanth's assistant
Babu Mohan as Prashanth's maternal uncle
Costumes Krishna as Thief 
Prudhvi Raj as Lord Venkateswara 
Radha Bai as Prasanth's mother
Radha Prasanthi as Nirmala's sister
Kalpana Rai
Master Tanish as Lord Ayyappa
Master Nandan as Chintu 
Baby Nitya as Bhavani

Soundtrack

Music composed by Vandemataram Srinivas. Lyrics written by Jonnavithhula Ramalingeswara Rao. Music released on ADITYA Music Company. The songs were well received.

Awards
Nandi Award for Best Music Director - Vandemataram Srinivas

References

External links

2000 films
2000s Telugu-language films
Hindu devotional films
Indian fantasy films
Films directed by Kodi Ramakrishna
2000 fantasy films